The 1995–96 Bulgarian Hockey League season was the 44th season of the Bulgarian Hockey League, the top level of ice hockey in Bulgaria. Five teams participated in the league, and HK Slavia Sofia won the championship.

Regular season

Final 
 HK Slavia Sofia - HK Levski Sofia 2:1 (11:5, 1:2, 3:1)

External links
 Season on hockeyarchives.info

Bulgar
Bulgarian Hockey League seasons
Bulg